In mining, the face is the surface where the mining work is advancing. In surface mining it is commonly called pit face, in underground mining a common term is mine face.

Accordingly, face equipment is the mining equipment used immediately at the mine face used for removal and near-face transportation  of the material: cutting machines, loaders, etc.

References

Mining terminology